Janet Vasconzuelo (born 4 July 1969) is a retired Peruvian female volleyball player. She was part of the Peru women's national volleyball team.

She competed with the national team at the 2000 Summer Olympics in Sydney, Australia, finishing 11th.

Career
Vasconzuelos won with the Peruvian club Cristal Bancoper the silver medal in the 1995 South American Club Championship played in Medellin, Colombia.

See also
 Peru at the 2000 Summer Olympics

References

External links
 
 
 

1969 births
Living people
Peruvian women's volleyball players
Place of birth missing (living people)
Volleyball players at the 2000 Summer Olympics
Olympic volleyball players of Peru
Pan American Games bronze medalists for Peru
Pan American Games medalists in volleyball
Volleyball players at the 1991 Pan American Games
Medalists at the 1991 Pan American Games
20th-century Peruvian women
21st-century Peruvian women